Southern Vales Christian College is a Christian school located across two campuses in South Australia. It is a ministry of Harvest Church.  The original campus is located in Morphett Vale with a second campus opened in Aldinga.

Southern Vales Christian College first opened in September 1980 as Morphett Vale Christian Community School operating as a ministry of the Morphett Vale Baptist Church (today known as Harvest Church). A second campus in Aldinga was opened in early 1991. Both campuses are promoted as having extensive experience with special needs students.

Controversy

Exposed for Homophobia by Nine News Adelaide 
On August 27, 2021, Nine News Adelaide reported that Southern Vales Christian College has a policy against hiring homosexual teachers.  While the college defended the policy based on Australia's religious discrimination laws, South Australian Premier Steven Marshall said, "South Australia has always been a diverse, accepting, respectful state and we don’t want to have discrimination here in our state."

References

External links
Official SVCC website
Harvest Church

1980 establishments in Australia
Nondenominational Christian schools in Adelaide
Educational institutions established in 1980
High schools in South Australia
Private schools in Adelaide